Hundeprutterutchebane (Danish for "Dog-Fart Roller Coaster") is a steel family roller coaster at BonBon-Land in southern Zealand, Denmark, approximately  from Copenhagen. The rollercoaster is well known for its name and its unique dog-flatulence-related theme. It is a good example of flatulence humor.

History and theme
Hundeprutterutchebane was the first coaster to open at BonBon-Land in 1993. BonBon-Land was opened in 1992 by a candy maker that manufactured disgusting-sounding candy flavors. Hundeprutter ("Dog Farts") was one of the most popular flavors and consequently became the theme for the first coaster at the park.
Built by Zierer, the coaster layout is a relatively simple family coaster, and it is the park's smallest roller coaster. The coaster trains are designed in the shape of a dog named "Henry Dog Fart", and the dog theme is pervasive throughout the coaster's course. Riders go past a statue of a defecating Henry the Dog, through a kennel, and past bones and piles of dog feces. There are also speakers throughout the ride which make farting sounds.

Reviews and press attention
Hundeprutterutchebane's unusual name and theme have attracted considerable attention. The coaster has been listed among the Travel Channel's "15 Wacky Rollercoasters" and is included in the mental_floss article "8 Theme Park Rides I Wouldn't Wait in Line For". The coaster has also been described by a number of other sources, including USA Today, Cracked, and The Chive.

Robb Alvey with the Travel Channel described Hundeprutterutchebane as having the most pure wackiness of any roller coaster, and Willy Volk with Gadling said that the coaster "gives new meaning to the phrase 'the wind in my face.'"

See also
Flatulence humour

References

1993 establishments in Denmark
Roller coasters in Denmark
Flatulence humor
Dogs in popular culture